The 2015–16 Mascom Top 8 Cup, also known as the Mascom Top 8 Season 5,  was the fifth edition of the Mascom Top 8 Cup. It was played from 29 October 2015 to 23 April 2016 by the top eight teams from the 2014-15 Botswana Premier League. It was won by Orapa United.

Gaborone United were the defending champions but were eliminated by BDF XI in the quarterfinals. Orapa United went on to win the tournament, making them the first ever northern team to win the Mascom Top 8 Cup.

History
The 2015–16 Mascom Top 8 Cup was the only domestic tournament played in Botswana since the FA Cup was not contested. The winner qualified to represent Botswana in the 2017 CAF Confederation Cup. This honour was won by Orapa United.

Prize money

 Champions: P1 200 000
 Runners up: P550 000
 Semifinalists: P300 000
 Quarterfinalists: P170 000

Format
The quarterfinals and semifinals were played over two legs both home and away, with only one final in a predetermined venue. Three points were awarded for a win, one point for a draw and none for a loss. Aggregate score was used to determine the winner of a round. Where the aggregate score was equal away goals were used to pick out the victor and if those were equal the tied teams went into a penalty shootout. There was no quarterfinal draw. The teams were seeded based on their position in the table, with the first placed team facing off against the eighth placed team.

Participants

Quarter-finals

Semi-finals
The draw for the semi-finals was conducted on

Final

Awards
 Top goalscorer |  Maano Ditshupo (4 goals) | Township Rollers
 Ronald Chikomo (4 goals) | Orapa United
 Player of the tournament |  Maano Ditshupo | Township Rollers
 Supporters' player of the tournament |  Segolame Boy | Township Rollers
 Goalkeeper of the tournament |  Mosimanegape Robert | Orapa United
 Supporters' goal of the tournament |  Betsho Pius | Police XI
 Coach of the tournament |  Madinda Ndlovu | Orapa United
 Referee of the tournament |  Tirelo Mositwane
 Assistant referee of the tournament |  Mogomotsi Morakile

References

Botswana Premier League
Football competitions in Botswana